Main Nagin Tu Nagina is a 2011 Indian, Bhojpuri-language drama film directed by Rajkumar R. Pandey and produced by Dilip Jaiswal, and associate directed by Manoj R Pandey, starring Manoj R Pandey, Pradeep Pandey,  Pakhi Hegde, Sanjay Mishta, Vaishnavi. The film was released on 21 March 2011.

Cast

 Manoj R Pandey
Pradeep Pandey
Pakhi Hegde
Sanjay Mishta
 Vaishnavi

Soundtrack
The Music Was Composed By Madhukar Anand and Released by Vee Gee Audio.

References

External links
 

2011 films
Indian fantasy action films
2010s Hindi-language films
2010s fantasy action films
Films directed by Rajkumar R. Pandey
2010s Bhojpuri-language films